Junior Lake is a  lake located on Vancouver Island north of Great Central Lake, north east of Oshinow Lake.

References

Alberni Valley
Lakes of Vancouver Island
Clayoquot Land District